The Bill Beaumont County Championship Division 2 (formerly known as County Championship Plate) is an annual rugby union competition in England between teams representing English counties. It was formed in 2002 as the County Championship Shield (a competition which is now played by tier 3 sides) - changing to Plate by 2010 and then to Bill Beaumont Division 2 by 2017.  Division 2 is contested for by second tier teams in the RFU County Championship. Each county draws its players from rugby union clubs from the third tier and below of the English rugby union league system (typically National League 1, National League 2 North or National League 2 South).

Division 2 is split into two regional groups (north) and (south) with each team playing one or two home games and the top teams in each group meeting in the final to be held at Twickenham Stadium along with other county divisional finals.  Since 2017 promotion and relegation occurs over two years as opposed to one, using a system of accumulative points from pool games to determine who goes up or down.  Currently the top two sides in Division 2 over the two years (one from each regional group) go up to tier 1 while the bottom two sides (again one from each regional group) are relegated to tier 3.

Past winners

Number of wins
Northumberland (4)
Cheshire (2)
Kent (2)
Leicestershire (2)
Warwickshire (2)
Durham County (1)
East Midlands (1)
Hertfordshire (1)
North Midlands (1)
Surrey (1)
Somerset (1)

Notes

References

See also
2011_results.pdf

Division 2
Recurring sporting events established in 2002
2002 establishments in England